Hang Lung may refer to the following Hong Kong companies:

Hang Lung Group, a listed company
Hang Lung Properties, subsidiary of Hang Lung Group
Hang Lung Bank, a defunct bank